Newton Nash Clements (December 23, 1837 – February 20, 1900) was a Colonel in the Confederate States Army and U.S. Representative from Alabama.

Biography
Born in Tuscaloosa County, Alabama to Hardy Clements and Maria Pegues Clements, Clements was graduated from the University of Alabama at Tuscaloosa in 1858. During his time at the University, he became the first pledge member of the Sigma Alpha Epsilon fraternity. Clements entered Harvard University in 1859 and studied law but never practiced.

During the Civil War, Clements entered the Confederate States Army as a captain in the 26th Alabama Infantry Regiment, later redesignated as the 50th Alabama Infantry Regiment. He was successively promoted to the ranks of major, lieutenant colonel, and colonel.

He served as member of the Alabama House of Representatives from 1870–1872 and 1874–1878, serving as speaker in the years, 1876, 1877, and 1878. Clements was elected as a Democrat to the Forty-sixth Congress to fill the vacancy caused by the resignation of Burwell B. Lewis and served from December 8, 1880 to March 3, 1881. He was an unsuccessful candidate for re-nomination in 1880. Clements was re-elected to the Alabama House in 1886, 1888, and 1890, and was again named speaker until 1896.

Clements was largely interested in planting and cotton manufactures. He died in Tuscaloosa, Alabama, February 20, 1900. Clements was interred at Evergreen Cemetery.

Notes

References

External links

1837 births
1900 deaths
University of Alabama alumni
Harvard Law School alumni
Democratic Party members of the Alabama House of Representatives
Confederate States Army officers
Democratic Party members of the United States House of Representatives from Alabama
19th-century American politicians